Ibrahim El-Gammal (born 23 March 1988) is an Egyptian basketball player for Al Ahly and the Egyptian national team, where he participated at the 2014 FIBA Basketball World Cup.

Honours

National Team
AfroBasket
 Runners-up:2013 Ivory coast

Clubs 

  Al Ahly

Egyptian Basketball Super League
 Winner: 2 :  2011–12, 2015-16
 
Egypt Basketball Cup
 Winner: (4) : 2006–07, 2008–09, 2010–11, 2017–18

Egyptian Mortabat League
  Winners (3) :2006/07, 2016/17, 2017-18

FIBA Africa Clubs Champions Cup
 Winner: (1) 2016 FIBA Africa Clubs Champions Cup 

 third : 2012 FIBA Africa Clubs Champions Cup

References

1988 births
Living people
Egyptian men's basketball players
Point guards
Shooting guards
African Games silver medalists for Egypt
African Games medalists in basketball
2014 FIBA Basketball World Cup players
Competitors at the 2007 All-Africa Games
20th-century Egyptian people
21st-century Egyptian people